The Little Akatarawa River is a river of the Wellington Region of New Zealand's North Island.

See also
List of rivers of New Zealand

References

Rivers of the Wellington Region
Rivers of New Zealand